Moon Je-Chun (Hanja: 文済天, born April 15, 1987) is a South Korean football player. As of April 2009, he is a free agent.

Moon previously played for the football club Sportakademklub Moscow in the Russian First Division.

Club statistics

References

External links

1987 births
Living people
South Korean footballers
South Korean expatriate footballers
J1 League players
J2 League players
Tokyo Verdy players
Expatriate footballers in Japan
Expatriate footballers in Russia
Association football defenders
FC Sportakademklub Moscow players
Footballers from Seoul